Scott Depot is an unincorporated community in Putnam County, West Virginia, United States. It is located along Crooked Creek at and downstream from the creek's intersection with Teays Valley Road.  The ZIP code is 25560. It is part of the census-designated place of Teays Valley which is a part of the Huntington-Ashland Metropolitan Statistical Area (MSA).

Education
Putnam County Schools operates public schools, including Scott Teays Elementary School.

The West Virginia International School (ウエストバージニア国際学校 Uesuto Bājinia Kokusai Gakkō), a Japanese weekend school, holds its classes at Scott Teays Elementary.

Notable people
Jayme Bailey, softball player at Hurricane High School and Virginia Tech

References

Unincorporated communities in Putnam County, West Virginia
Unincorporated communities in West Virginia
Charleston, West Virginia metropolitan area